, subtitled The Unforgiving Flowers Blossom in the Dead of Night, is a Japanese manga written by Ryukishi07 of 07th Expansion and illustrated by Ichirō Tsunohazu. It was serialized between the May 2010 and November 2012 issues of Fujimi Shobo's Monthly Dragon Age magazine. 07th Expansion adapted the manga into a dōjin visual novel series, with the first game released on August 13, 2011 at Comiket 80 and the second on December 31, 2011 at Comiket 81.

Plot
Higanbana no Saku Yoru ni takes place in an unnamed school setting and is composed of numerous self-contained short stories, each told from the perspective of a student or staff member from the school. These stories feature bullying as a major overlying theme, as each story's protagonist is depicted as being either a victim of bullying or a bully themselves. Higanbana revolves around a series of urban legends caused by supernatural beings called yōkai, each of which claims ownership of a particular "mystery" and kills anyone who tries to investigate it. There are a total of seven "mysteries" at the start of the series, with numerous yōkai fighting each other in an ongoing turf war for ownership of these mysteries, which is granted to the seven yōkai who emerge victorious in the conflict. The stories' protagonists interact with at least one of the school's resident yōkai, who force the protagonists to deal with the consequences of their actions regarding bullying.

Main characters

Marie is the main protagonist of the first short story, titled Mesomeso-san. She is introduced as a student who is constantly bullied by her classmates and molested by her homeroom teacher at an abandoned school building neighboring her school. While despairing over her predicament in the public toilet of the building, she becomes the subject of an eighth urban legend involving a yōkai named Mesomeso (derived from the Japanese onomatopoeia for weeping and sobbing) that haunts the toilet. The school's yōkai offer her the chance to become a yōkai in order to fill the new rank in their hierarchy, which she does after being strangled to death by her teacher. As Mesomeso, she appears before the series's other protagonists to support them if they are victims of bullying, or to confront them if they themselves are bullies.

Higanbana is the third-highest ranking yōkai in the school, also known as the "Dancing Higanbana". She is a very beautiful girl who takes the form of a Western doll that sits in the school infirmary and, according to her associated legend, dances on its own at night. She is the yōkai who directly offers Marie to become Mesomeso, and treats her as her personal assistant. She regularly torments cruel or weak-willed students, and is depicted as either an antagonist if she targets a story's hero, or as an antihero if she targets a villain.

Background
Higanbana no Saku Yoru ni'''s origin dates back to 2006 when Ryukishi07 started writing a serial light novel titled , with illustrations by Nishieda. The novel first appeared in the third volume of Fujimi Shobo's Dragon Age Pure magazine on November 29, 2006. Two more chapters were serialized in Dragon Age Pure before it was discontinued: chapter two in volume four sold on April 20, 2007 and chapter three in volume five sold on June 20, 2007. The novel was adapted into a manga illustrated by Rei Izumi titled . A short preview of the manga appeared in the fifth volume of Dragon Age Pure, and was discontinued after the first chapter appeared in the sixth volume of Dragon Age Pure on August 20, 2007.

Media
Printed mediaHiganbana no Saku Yoru ni began as a manga written by Ryukishi07 of 07th Expansion and illustrated by Ichirō Tsunohazu. The character designs were originally designed by Nishieda. The manga was serialized between the May 2010 and November 2012 issues of Fujimi Shobo's Monthly Dragon Age magazine. Six tankōbon volumes were released between November 9, 2010 and February 9, 2013. A light novel written by Ryukishi07 with illustrations by Tsuitachi Sakuya titled Higanbana no Saku Yoru ni was published by Fujimi Shobo on December 20, 2011.

Visual novels
07th Expansion produced two dōjin visual novels based on the manga. The first game, titled , was released on August 13, 2011 at Comiket 80. The second game, subtitled , was released on December 31, 2011 at Comiket 81. Unlike 07th Expansion's previous game series Higurashi no Naku Koro ni and Umineko no Naku Koro ni, both Higanbana games contain seven novellas and are about the same length as an Umineko game. The games were also distributed by MangaGamer since February 7, 2014 for explicit use of the English translation patch, but following the end of the deal between MangaGamer and 07th Expansion, they have ceased to sell the games.

The port of the first visual novel to the Nintendo 3DS was released by FuRyu on July 27, 2016 alongside The House in Fata Morgana and World End Economica: Episode 1'' as a digital-only title.

References

External links
 Higanbana no Saku Yoru ni at Fujimi Shobo 
 Visual novel official website 
 

2010 manga
2011 video games
Doujin video games
Fiction about urban legends
Fujimi Shobo manga
Japan-exclusive video games
Horror anime and manga
2010s horror video games
Nintendo 3DS games
NScripter games
Ryukishi07
Shōnen manga
Video games developed in Japan
Visual novels
Windows games
Windows-only games